Vanderhaege's toad-headed turtle (Mesoclemmys vanderhaegei) is a species of turtle in the family Chelidae. The species is endemic to South America.

Etymology
The specific name, vanderhaegei, is in honor of Maurice Vanderhaege, who is an expert in breeding reptiles in terraria.

Description
The ellipsoidal carapace, similar to that of M. gibbus but with a low medial groove, is somewhat serrated with a shallow subcaudal notch, and usually broadest at the 8th marginals and highest on the 3rd vertebral. Some rough striations may occur on the scutes. Vertebrals are broader than long. The carapace is brown to gray or black. The plastron covers much of the carapacial opening, is slightly upturned anteriorly, and is posteriorly notched. The intergular scute completely separates the gulars, but not the humerals, and is slightly shorter than, or about the same length as, its distance from the abdominals. The plastral formula is variable, but the femoral, abdominal and intergular scutes are usually longest. The plastron is yellow with a brown to black pattern which usually extends between the pectorals and femorals. Head and neck are considerably shorter than the carapace. The snout slightly protrudes and the upper jaw is neither notched nor serrated. Head and neck are gray, throat and chin yellow, and the yellowish upper jaws are seldom marked with dark pigment. Some orange vermiculations may occur on the head, and the lower jaw may be red. Other skin is gray to olive, and there is a fringe of large scales on the outer border of the forelimbs.
Males have slightly longer, thicker tails with the vent nearer the tip, and a deep plastral notch. Females have a shallow plastral notch.

Habitat and geographic range
Mesoclemmys vanderhaegei is known only from densely vegetated rivers and swamps in southern Brazil, Paraguay, and northern Argentina; possibly it also occurs in Bolivia and Uruguay.

Natural history
Vanderhaege's toad-headed turtle is little known. M. vanderhaegei is diurnally active and carnivorous, and was characterized by Cei (1993) as aggressive, with a ferocious temper.

Reproduction

Taxonomy
Mesoclemmys vanderhaegei is closely related to M. gibbus, and may even be a subspecies of that species. It was first described by Bour (1973) as a subspecies of the broad-headed M. tuberculatus, but was raised to full species rank by Bour and Pauler (1987).

Conservation status
IUCN Red List Status (1996)
Lower risk: near threatened.

References

External links
Tortoise & Freshwater Turtle Specialist Group (1996).  Phrynops vanderhaegei.   2006 IUCN Red List of Threatened Species.   Downloaded on 29 July 2007.

Mesoclemmys
Turtles of South America
Reptiles of Argentina
Reptiles of Bolivia
Reptiles of Brazil
Reptiles of Paraguay
Reptiles of Uruguay
Reptiles described in 1973
Taxonomy articles created by Polbot